The Village Rogue is a 1916 Hungarian silent drama film directed by Miklós Pásztory and starring Helene von Bolváry, Dezső Kertész, and Péter Andorffy. It was based on an 1875 play by Ede Tóth. An alternative translation of its title is Village Rascal.

Cast

Bibliography

External links

1916 films
Hungarian silent feature films
Hungarian drama films
1910s Hungarian-language films
Hungarian black-and-white films
Austro-Hungarian films
1916 drama films
Silent drama films